The 2018–19 National Basketball League (Czech Republic) season was the 26th season of the Czech NBL. ČEZ Nymburk achieved their 16th consecutive title, this time without losing any game in the whole season.

Format
Teams in regular season play home and away against every other team in a round-robin tournament, before being split into two groups of six teams for playing again home and away against the teams from the same group.

After the end of the stage after the first split, the six teams from to top group and the two first qualified teams from the bottom group joined the play-offs.

The other four teams would play again home and away against themselves for avoiding the relegation.

Teams

Regular season

League table

Results

Second stage

Group A1

Standings

Results

Group A2

Standings

Results

Playoffs
Seeded teams played at home games 1, 2, 5 and 7, while the third place game where played with a best-of-three format, playing the seeded team the matches 1 and 3 at home, and the finals in a double-legged one.

Bracket

Round of 16

|}

Quarter-finals

|}

Semi-finals

|}

Third place

|}

Finals

|}

Relegation group

Standings

Czech clubs in European competitions

Czech clubs in international competitions

References

External links
NBL official website 

Czech Republic
Basketball
National Basketball League (Czech Republic)